The 1978–79 Northern Football League season was the 81st in the history of Northern Football League, a football competition in England.

Clubs

Division One featured 20 clubs which competed in the league last season, no new clubs joined the division this season.

League table

References

External links
 Northern Football League official site

Northern Football League seasons
1978–79 in English football leagues